Venícius Ribeiro Mariane Fambre, better known as Buru, is a former Brazilian beach soccer player. He played as a defender.

Honours

Beach soccer
 Brazil
FIFA Beach Soccer World Cup winner: 2006, 2007, 2008, 2009
FIFA Beach Soccer World Cup qualification (CONMEBOL) winner : 2005, 2006, 2008, 2009, 2011
Mundialito winner: 2004, 2005, 2006, 2007, 2010, 2011
Copa Latina winner: 2005, 2006, 2009

Individual
Beach Soccer MVP: 2007
FIFA Beach Soccer World Cup Top Scorer Golden Ball (MVP): 2007
FIFA Beach Soccer World Cup Top Scorer Golden Shoe (Top Scorer): 2007
FIFA Beach Soccer World Cup Top Scorer Bronze Shoe (Top Scorer): 2009
Mundialito MVP: 2006

References

External links
CBBS Brasil
Stats at FIFA

1976 births
Living people
People from Vitória, Espírito Santo
Brazilian beach soccer players
Sportspeople from Espírito Santo